Hare Forest Farm is a historic home and farm complex located near Orange, Orange County, Virginia, United States. The main house was built in three sections starting about 1815. It consists of a two-story, four-bay, brick center block in the Federal style, a two-story brick dining room wing which dates from the early 20th century, and a mid-20th-century brick kitchen wing. Also on the property are the contributing stone garage, a 19th-century frame smokehouse with attached barn, an early-20th-century frame barn, a vacant early-20th-century tenant house, a stone tower, an early-20th-century frame tenant house, an abandoned storage house, as well as the stone foundations of three dwellings of undetermined date.  The land was once owned by William Strother, maternal grandfather of Zachary Taylor, and it has often been claimed that the future president was born on the property.

It was listed on the National Register of Historic Places in 1992.

References

Houses on the National Register of Historic Places in Virginia
Farms on the National Register of Historic Places in Virginia
Houses completed in 1815
Federal architecture in Virginia
Colonial Revival architecture in Virginia
Houses in Orange County, Virginia
National Register of Historic Places in Orange County, Virginia